Egon Kaur (born 20 August 1987) is an Estonian rally driver.

Career
Egon started rallying in 2004, and made his World Rally Championship debut on the 2006 Wales Rally GB in a Renault Clio. His next WRC appearances came in the 2008 season in Sweden and Wales, behind the wheel of a Subaru Impreza WRX STi. He contested Wales Rally GB again at the end of 2009.

After winning the Estonian Group N title in 2010, Egon contested the new WRC Academy class in 2011. He won the first three rounds of the season in Portugal, Sardinia and Finland. Kaur narrowly missed winning the 2011 FIA WRC Academy title to Craig Breen, with equal championship points but fewer fastest stage times.

In February 2011 Egon was one of 12 drivers selected for the first FIA Institute Young Driver Excellence Academy.
In 2012 he started to use the experience gained from the academies to manage a similar program named "EAL Akadeemia" for young Estonian drivers.

His main sponsors throughout the years have been Estonian based companies Provintsi Transport, Gustaf Tallinn and DS Seaways (former Baltic Scandinavian Lines).

Currently in 2013 Egon is driving in local Estonian championship and running his Kaur Motorsport rallyschool.

Results

WRC results 

* Season still in progress.

WRC-2 results

WRC-3 results

PWRC results

WRC Academy results

References

External links

Official website

1987 births
Living people
Estonian rally drivers
World Rally Championship drivers
FIA Institute Young Driver Excellence Academy drivers
European Rally Championship drivers
Motorsport team owners
Sportspeople from Pärnu